Uttara Model Town or simply Uttara ( romanised: Uttora) is a suburb of Dhaka, the capital of Bangladesh. The name derives from the Bengali word uttor meaning "north". It lies on the road to Gazipur, and adjoins Hazrat Shahjalal International Airport.

History

Planning
In 1966, Dhaka Improvement Trust planned to build a satellite town under North Satellite Town project in Dhaka District. In 1980, DIT changed the project name into Uttara Residential Model Town Project.

First phase
RAJUK completed the first phase of the project in 1992. In this phase Uttara had 6,000 plots. The total land for these plots was 950 acres. Completed sectors in 1st phase are Sector 1, Sector 2, Sector 3, Sector 4, Sector 5, Sector 6, Sector 7, Sector 8, Sector 9, and Sector 10.

Second phase
New phase started after the completion of first phase. Second phase took 6 years to complete. Completed sectors in 2nd phase are Sector 11, Sector 12, Sector 13, and Sector 14.

Third phase

During the course of the third phase circa 2,150 acres (8.7 km2) of land were acquired. About 10,000 residential plots and 225,512 apartments including amenities and urban facilities were provided.
The estimated cost of third phase is Tk 23.16 billion. The deadline of the extension project was extended to June 2022.
Planned sectors in 3rd phase are Sector 15, Sector 16, Sector 17, and Sector 18.

Demographics
At the 2011 Bangladesh census, Uttara had a population of 179,907. According to 2011 figures, males constitute 56.33% of the population and females 43.67%, and about 80% of the Uttara's population are adults. Uttara has an average literacy rate of 90.49% (7+ years).

Administration
Uttara is divided by administrative and geographical division named Sector. There are 18 sectors in Uttara. Every sector is under a sector welfare association. Uttara Association is the combination of these sector-wise associations. Suburban of Uttara is under two wards (Ward no. 1 and Ward no. 51) of DNCC. Politically this area is under Dhaka-18 constituency.

Ward councillor

Geography

Inner Uttara
 Sector 1
 Sector 2
 Sector 3
 Sector 4
 Sector 5
 Sector 6
 Sector 7
 Sector 8
 Sector 9
 Sector 10
 Sector 11
 Sector 12
 Sector 13
 Sector 14
 Sector 15
 Sector 16
 Sector 17
 Sector 18

Outer Uttara
 Uttarkhan/ Uttar Khan
 Dakshinkhan/ Dakshin Khan/ Daxinkhan
 Phulbaria (Adjacent to Sector 10)
 Ranabhola (Adjacent to Sector 10)
 Kamarpara (Adjacent to Sector 10)
 Dhour
 Bamnartek
 Nolbhog
 Noa Nagar
 Dolipara (Adjacent to Sector 5)
 Katoitala (Adjacent to Sector 5)
 Pakuria
 Diabari
 Khantek
 Jatrabari
 Ahalia
 Ashkona
 Khalpar
 Tarartek
 Abdullahpur (Situated at the banks of turag river, adjacent to sector 9)

Private Housing
 Priyanka City (Adjacent to Sector 12)
 Rupayan City (Situated to the west at the end of Sector 12 of Uttara)

Economy
Uttara is a planned city and one of elite suburbs in Dhaka. For that and many attractive features, Uttara is one of desirable places in Dhaka. According to a survey conducted by B-property in 2019, Uttara is the first choice of Dhaka residents for living. 
Mr Nuswardi is a Chief Executive of the property website named B-Property. He said to BBC Bangla that this planned satellite town is an important place in the capital of Bangladesh which has all necessary amenities and services the residents need. In the future, more and more people will start living in Purbachal, which is located adjacent to the town so it is a plus point. Uttara is preferable for many other reasons too.

Uttara is a popular destination for shooting Bangladeshi dramas.

Sector 7 Bridge is popular for street food. There are many restaurants in Uttara. The suburb also has many posh, luxurious restaurants and fine-dinings. Many people from other parts of Dhaka visit these restaurants to eat.

Uttara has many education institutions such as RAJUK Uttara Model College, International University of Business Agriculture and Technology, Uttara University,  Aeronautical Institute of Bangladesh. Uttara is also home to the city's some of the popular and prestigious schools of English Medium curriculum such as Sunnydale, Sunbeams, Scholastica, International Hope School Bangladesh, etc.

Parks and recreation
Uttara Model Town has 8 parks and lakes. Sector 1, 2, 5, 8, 9 and 10 has no park. There are lakes in Uttara except 1, 2, 6, 8, 10 and 12. Fun park and Electrofun are children's recreation center in Uttara. There is a children amusement park in sector 15 named Fantasy Island.

Transportation

Roads

Many bus services give various transportation service in Uttara. Many taxi services are available in this town such as Uber, Pathao, Shohoz, InDrive,  etc.

Rail

Residents of Uttara use Dhaka Airport Railway Station to travel any nearer or remote area for various purposes. Situated opposite to Hazrat Shahjalal International Airport, it can be accessed from the Airport Road.

The MRT Line 6 of Dhaka Metro connects Diabari of Uttara to Agargaon. 

There are three metro stations in Uttara under MRT Line 6, they includes: Uttara North, Uttara Centre and Uttara South.

Air

There is an airport situated in Kurmitola, Dhaka named Shahjalal International Airport. It can be accessed by the eight-lane Airport Road. To the north of the airport lies Uttara area and Gazipur city, while Dhaka city lies to its south. There is a railway station immediately outside (facing) the airport named Airport Railway Station.

Streets
 Sonargaon Janapath
 Jashimuddin Avenue
 Isha Kha Avenue
 Rabindra Sarani
 Gareeb-e-Nawaz Avenue
 Gausul Azam Avenue
 Shah Makhdum Avenue
 Alaul Avenue
 Shayesta Kha Avenue
 Shahjalal Avenue
 Ranabhola Avenue
 Eskaton Avenue

Public institutions

Post Office
There is a sub-post office situated in sector 3. Its postal code is 1230.

Fire Service
There is a fire service and civil defence station in Uttara.

Regional Passport Office
Uttara has RPO (Regional Passport Office) situated in sector 12.

Thanas
The town of Uttara has three thanas (police stations).
 Uttara East Thana
 Uttara West Thana
 Turag Thana

Hospitals
 Aichi Hospital
 Al Ashraf General Hospital
 Kuwait Bangladesh Friendship Government Hospital
 Radical Hospital
 Shin Shin Japan Hospital
 Uttara Adhunik Medical College & Hospital
 Japan East West Medical College Hospital
 Women and Children's Hospital, Uttara
 Ahsania Mission Cancer & General Hospital

Education

Schools

 Aga Khan School, Dhaka
 Armed Police Battalion High School
 Azampur Government Primary School
 Bangladesh International Tutorial (BIT)
 Belmont International School
 Blooming Flower School
 Child Plan School
 Don Bosco School and College
 DPS STS School
 Euro International School
 Green Lawn School and College
 Heritage International College
 International Turkish Hope School, Dhaka
 Kids Campus School
 Life Preparatory School
 MaHaad International School
 Mastermind School
 Mileshium School
 Milestone College
 Moajjem Hossain Ideal School & College
 Nawab Habibullah Model School & College
 Oxford International School, Uttara campus
 Peace International School (PIS)
 Premier School Dhaka (PSD)
 Rangon Academy
 Rajuk Uttara Model College
 Rangon Art School
 Red Brick School
 Scholastica school
 Sky Touch School
 South Breeze School
 Sunbeams School
 Sunnydale
 The Headway School
 Time International Academy
 Uttara High School and College
 Uttara Model College
 Uttara Model School
 Uttara Town College

Colleges and universities

 Aeronautical Institute of Bangladesh
 Aeronautical College of Bangladesh
 Asian University
 Atish Dipankar University of Science and Technology
 BGMEA Institute of Fashion & Technology
 Heritage International College of Aviation Science and Management
 International University of Business Agriculture and Technology
 Shanto Mariam University of Creative Technology
 Tagore University of Creative Arts
 Uttara University

Medical colleges

 Japan East West Medical College Hospital
 Medical College for Women and Hospital
 Shaheed Monsur Ali Medical College
 Uttara Adhunik Medical College & Hospital

Gallery

See also

 Azampur, Uttara
 Dakshinkhan Union
 House Building, Uttara
 Neighbourhoods in Dhaka Metropolitan Area
 Uttar Khan Thana

Notes

References

External links
 
 

Neighbourhoods in Dhaka
 
Planned cities in Bangladesh
1966 establishments in East Pakistan
Populated places established in the 1960s